The 2013 Sports Lottery Cup Wuxi Classic was a professional ranking snooker tournament held between 17 and 23 June 2013 at the Wuxi City Sports Park Stadium in Wuxi, China. It was the first ranking event of the 2013/2014 season.

The tournament was the first to use the new format, similar to the one used in the minor-ranking Players Tour Championship events, where every player, including members of the top 16, started in the first round. Some of the sport's biggest names did not reach the tournament's final stage. Reigning world champion Ronnie O'Sullivan withdrew for personal reasons shortly before his qualifying match against Michael Wasley. World number one Mark Selby lost his qualifying match 3–5 to Andrew Pagett. World number four Shaun Murphy also exited the tournament at the qualifying stage, losing 1–5 to Alex Davies.

Nine-time women's world champion Reanne Evans defeated Thailand's Thepchaiya Un-Nooh 5–4 in her qualifying match to become the first woman ever to reach the final stages of a major professional ranking tournament. Evans was chosen as one of four players to play against local opponents in the wildcard round, and she lost 2–5 against Chinese teenager Zhu Yinghui.

Ricky Walden was the defending champion, but he lost 2–5 against Jimmy White in the last 64.

Neil Robertson won his eighth ranking title by defeating John Higgins 10–7 in the final. Robertson also made the 98th official maximum break during his qualifying match against Mohamed Khairy. This was Robertson's second 147 break and the first in the 2013/2014 season.

Prize fund
The total prize money of the event was raised to £470,000 from the previous year's £400,000. This is £45,000 more than what was announced in 2012. The breakdown of prize money for this year is shown below:

Winner: £80,000
Runner-up: £35,000
Semi-final: £20,000
Quarter-final: £11,500
Last 16: £8,000
Last 32: £6,500
Last 64: £3,000

Non-televised highest break: £0
Televised highest break: £2,000
Non-televised maximum break: £3,000
Total: £470,000

Wildcard round
These matches were played in Wuxi on 17 June 2013.

Main draw

Final

Qualifying
These matches were held between 27 and 29 May 2013 at The Capital Venue in Gloucester, England. All matches were best of 9 frames.

Century breaks

Qualifying stage centuries

 147, 121  Neil Robertson
 139  Tian Pengfei
 135  John Astley
 135  Lyu Haotian
 133  Dominic Dale
 132  Joe Perry
 131  Steve Davis
 129, 109, 108  Judd Trump
 127  Ricky Walden
 121  Stuart Bingham
 116, 106  Ding Junhui
 116  Kurt Maflin

 115  Martin Gould
 112  Anthony Hamilton
 111, 108  Mark Allen
 111, 104  Marco Fu
 111  Ben Woollaston
 110  Peter Lines
 105  Thepchaiya Un-Nooh
 102  Mark Williams
 100  Dechawat Poomjaeng
 100  Jamie Cope
 100  Gary Wilson

Televised stage centuries

 138, 116, 101  John Higgins
 138, 103  David Morris
 127  Anthony Hamilton
 125  Jimmy Robertson
 122, 115  Marco Fu
 122, 102  Cao Yupeng
 120  Robert Milkins
 117, 104  Fergal O'Brien
 117  Adam Duffy

 115  Lu Ning
 113, 111  Neil Robertson
 106, 100, 100  David Gilbert
 105  Stuart Bingham
 104  Matthew Stevens
 104  Mark Williams
 102  Scott Donaldson
 100  Jack Lisowski
 100  Peter Lines

References

External links
 
 2013 Wuxi Classic – Pictures by Tai Chengzhe at Facebook

2013
2013 in snooker
2013 in Chinese sport